The Landtag of the Saarland is the state diet of the German federal state of Saarland. It convenes in Saarbrücken and currently consists of 51 members of five parties. The Social Democratic Party of Germany (SPD) is the largest party in the Landtag with 29 seats, an absolute majority that allows the party to govern without a coalition.  The 2022 elections marked the first time that the SPD had won the state in 20 years.

History 
As a consequence of the German Empire's defeat in the First World War, the Saargebiet was separated from Germany. There was no Saarland representative body during the Third Reich. After the German defeat in World War II, the Saarland became a French protectorate.

On May 23, 1947, a 20-member constitutional commission was formed to draft a foundational document for the Saarland in the parliamentary manner of the other German countries. On October 5, 1947, a constitutional assembly was elected that became Saarland's first state parliament following the successful adoption of the constitution.

The Landtag of the Saarland meets in the building built in 1865/1866 for the Saarbrücken Casino Society in what is now Franz-Josef-Röder-Strasse. The building was designed by the architect Julius Carl Raschdorff, noted as the designer of the Berlin Cathedral.

Current composition
The last election of the Landtag of Saarland was on 27 March 2022.

Elections are conducted using a proportional representation system, with a 5% threshold to receive seats.

See also
 List of presidents of the Landtag of Saarland
 1999 Saarland state election
 2004 Saarland state election
 2009 Saarland state election
 2012 Saarland state election
 2017 Saarland state election
 2022 Saarland state election

References

External links
  

Saarland
Landtag of Saarland